William John Tout (1870–1946) was Labour MP for Oldham, a two-member constituency.

Tout began working in a cotton mill in Burnley at the age of ten, initially as a half-timer.  He opposed the half-time system, and took part in the Burnley Weavers' Association's campaigns against it.  This activity gradually brought him to prominence, and in 1911, Tout was elected as the general secretary of the Todmorden Weavers' Association.  Four years later, he was elected as vice-president of the Amalgamated Weavers' Association, to which the Todmorden union was affiliated.  He also served on the executive of the United Textile Factory Workers' Association.

Tout stood as a UTFWA-sponsored candidate in Oldham at the 1922 United Kingdom general election, winning the seat, and held it in 1923.  He lost his seat in 1924, possibly as a result of Labour standing two candidates.  He stood unsuccessfully again at the 1925 Oldham by-election.  He then won Sowerby from the Unionists in 1929, but lost it in 1931.

Out of Parliament, Tout retained his trade union posts until 1945, and remained secretary of the Todmorden Weavers until his death the following year.

References

External links 

Labour Party (UK) MPs for English constituencies
People from Oldham
1870 births
1946 deaths
Place of death missing
UK MPs 1922–1923
UK MPs 1923–1924
UK MPs 1929–1931
United Textile Factory Workers' Association-sponsored MPs